The 1988 season was the eighth in the history of Wollongong City (now Wollongong Wolves). It was the seventh season in the National Soccer League. In addition to the domestic league, they also participated in the NSL Cup. Wollongong City finished 1st in their National Soccer League season, and were eliminated in the NSL Cup first round by Brisbane Lions.

Players

Competitions

Overview

National Soccer League

League table

Results by round

Matches

Finals series

NSL Cup

Statistics

Appearances and goals
Players with no appearances not included in the list.

Clean sheets

References

Wollongong Wolves FC seasons